Abellon is a surname. Notable people with the surname include:

 André Abellon (1375–1450), French Roman Catholic priest
 Richard Abellon (died 2008), Filipino bishop